Jennings Randolph Lake is a reservoir of   located on the North Branch Potomac River in Garrett County, Maryland and Mineral County, West Virginia.  It is approximately eight miles upstream of Bloomington, Maryland, and approximately five miles north of Elk Garden, West Virginia.

Construction and management
The lake was constructed by the U.S. Army Corps of Engineers (USACE), as authorized by the Flood Control Act of October 23, 1962 (Public Law 87-874) and is described in House Document No. 469, 87th United States Congress, second session. Originally named "Bloomington Dam", it was renamed Jennings Randolph Lake in 1987 to honor the US Senator from West Virginia who was instrumental in this and many other water resource projects across the nation. Construction of the lake was completed in 1981, and resulted in the flooding of the community of Shaw, West Virginia and the realignment of West Virginia Route 46.  The dam, rolled earth and rock fill, is 296 feet high, has a crest length of 2,130 feet and contains 10 million cubic yards of material. Jennings Randolph Lake strives to provide water quality improvements and reduce flood damages downstream of the lake, provide a source of water supply for downstream municipalities and industries, and provide the public with recreation opportunities. With a full conservation pool, the lake controls a drainage area of 263 square miles, is about 5.5 miles long, and has a surface area of 952 acres. The lake serves as an emergency reservoir for the Washington, D.C. metropolitan area and is managed by the Corps of Engineers. Coordination of the lake's use for water supply purposes is managed by the Interstate Commission on the Potomac River Basin (ICPRB).

The impoundment also collects acid mine drainage from coal mines located upstream, which improves the water quality of the river downstream.

Planned hydroelectric facility
In 2008 Fairlawn Hydroelectric Company filed a proposal with the Federal Energy Regulatory Commission (FERC) to construct a hydroelectric facility at the dam. FERC approved a license for a 14 MW facility on April 30, 2012. In 2016, Fairlawn Hydroelectric reported that it had not yet obtained construction permits from USACE, and it obtained an extension of time from FERC to begin and complete the project.

Recreational facilities
Howell Run Picnic Area
Howell Run Boat Launch
Robert W. Craig Campground
Shaw Beach
West Virginia Overlook
Maryland Overlook
Maryland Boat Launch

References

Chesapeake Bay watershed
Bodies of water of Garrett County, Maryland
Reservoirs in Maryland
Reservoirs in West Virginia
Bodies of water of Mineral County, West Virginia
Potomac River watershed
Tourist attractions in Mineral County, West Virginia
Tourist attractions in Garrett County, Maryland
Dams in Maryland
Dams in West Virginia
Dams completed in 1981
United States Army Corps of Engineers dams